Stavros Alevras (born: 12 October 1970 Athens) is a sailor from Greece, who represented his country at the 1996 Summer Olympics in Savannah, United States as helmsman in the Soling. With crew members Panagiotis Alevras and Stefanos Chandakas they took the 18th place.

References

1967 births
Living people
Sailors at the 1996 Summer Olympics – Soling
Olympic sailors of Greece
Sailors (sport) from Athens
Greek male sailors (sport)